Cottbus was a district of the German Democratic Republic (East Germany). The administrative seat and main town was Cottbus.

History
The district was established, along with the other 13, on 25 July 1952, de facto replacing the East German States which had been established in the post-war period; these in turn had replaced the Nazi  (and the pre-war States and Prussian Provinces which had been de facto but not de jure superseded by the ). Most of  Cottbus had been part of Brandenburg, with smaller parts taken from Saxony and Saxony-Anhalt

Geography

Position
It also bordered Poland.

Subdivision

The Bezirk was divided into 15 : 1 urban district and 14 rural districts: 
Urban district: Cottbus.
Rural districts: ; ; ; ; ; ; ; ; ; ; ; ; ; .

References

External links

Cottbus
Bezirk Cottbus
Bezirk Cottbus
History of Cottbus
Former states and territories of Saxony
Former states and territories of Brandenburg